The Dengue pandemic in Sri Lanka is part of the tropical disease Dengue fever pandemic. Dengue fever caused by Dengue virus. first recorded since 1960s. It's not native disease in this Island. Present day dengue has become a major public health problem. Aedes aegypti and Aedes albopictus both mosquito species native in Sri Lanka. But never found this disease early 1960s. First dengue outbreak confirmed in 1962. Following a Chikungunya outbreak in 1965. Early 1970s two type dominated in Sri Lanka. DENV-1 type1 and DENV-2 type 2. 51 cases and 15 deaths reported in 1965–1968. From 1989 onward, Dengue fever has become endemic in Sri Lanka.

Status of outbreak

History 
Dengue outbreak start Sri Lanka since 1960s, Ministry of Health officially confirmed in 1962. However, unofficial British Ceylon clinical studies recorded in Sri Lanka from early 20th century. But World Health Organization officially confirmed in 1965. First outbreak start five years after officially confirmed. First outbreak associated with DEN types 1 and 2, with 51 cases of 15 deaths in between 1965 to 1968. Since 1989 Dengue become a major problem in Sri Lanka. Thereafter, from 1970 to 1990, multiple outbreak with endemic was reported in Western Province. urban areas. In 1990 dengue cases rise 1,350 of54 deaths. Early 90s, annually dengue cases  reported up to 1,000. In 2002 recorded the largest outbreak in the recent past with 8,931 cases and 64 deaths. The following years 2003, was one of the relatively low endemicity with only 4,749 suspected cases and 32 deaths reported. In 2004 there were 15,463 suspected cases and 88 deaths reported to the Epidemiological Unit of the Ministry of Health. During the year 2005, 5,211 cases of suspected cases of DF/DHF and 26 deaths were reported to the Epidemiological unit. 

Most dengue cases reported dominated in Western Province. Outbreaks from 2005-2008 were attributed to a new mutation DEN type 3. Almost all the districts in Sri Lanka have reported cases and posed a threat to the health of the people. Colombo, Gampaha, Kalutara and Kandy districts have recorded highest number of cases.

Background 
Sri Lanka is a tropical and warm country. Mean temperatures range from 28 °C. The rainfall pattern is influenced by monsoon winds from the Indian Ocean and Bay of Bengal. Average rain at 800 to 1,200 mm per year. Average humidity from 75% during different seasons and in the different regions of the country. Tropical region humidity range from 75%-90%. Sri Lanka is a tropical country with two monsoons, the northeast monsoon (December to March) and the southwest monsoon (May to September). Two annual peaks have been identified in the occurrence of dengue cases in the country in association with the monsoon rain.

See also 
 Dengue fever
 Mosquito-borne disease
 Tropical disease

References 

Sri Lanka
Dengue Sri Lanka
Sri Lanka
Dengue